The Dutch Eerste Divisie in the 2003–04 season was contested by 19 teams, one more than in the previous season. This was due to AGOVV Apeldoorn entering from the amateurs. FC Den Bosch won the championship.

Promoted Teams
These teams were promoted to the Eredivisie
 Den Bosch — Eerste Divisie champions
 De Graafschap — playoff winners

New entrants
Entering from amateur football
 AGOVV Apeldoorn
Relegated from the 2002–03 Eredivisie
 Excelsior
 De Graafschap

League standings

Playoff standings

See also
 2003–04 Eredivisie
 2003–04 KNVB Cup

References
Netherlands - List of final tables (RSSSF)

Eerste Divisie seasons
2003–04 in Dutch football
Neth